Juan Carlos Pérez (born 6 October 1981 in Sucre) is a Bolivian trap shooter. He competed in the trap event at the 2012 Summer Olympics and placed 31st in the qualification round.

References

1981 births
Living people
Bolivian male sport shooters
Olympic shooters of Bolivia
Shooters at the 2012 Summer Olympics
Pan American Games competitors for Bolivia
Shooters at the 2011 Pan American Games
People from Sucre